Eliseo Arredondo de la Garza (5 May 1870 – 18 October 1923) was a Mexican politician and diplomat who briefly served as secretary of the Interior in the government of President Venustiano Carranza; his cousin and father-in-law. Arredondo also served as a federal congressman in the Chamber of Deputies, negotiated on behalf of Carranza with revolutionary leader, Pancho Villa, and, while working as chargé d'affaires in Washington, D.C., he secured diplomatic recognition for Carranza's administration from the United States government.

Biography
He was born on 5 May 1870. He served as Secretary of the Interior from 21 August 1914 to 29 November 1914. He served as Ambassador of Mexico to the United States from 24 February 1916 to 24 February 1917. In April 1918 he was transferred to the embassy in Madrid. He died on 18 October 1923.

Gallery

References

External links

1870 births
1923 deaths
Mexican Secretaries of the Interior
Ambassadors of Mexico to the United States
Politicians from Coahuila
Members of the Chamber of Deputies (Mexico)